Öğretir is a Turkish surname. Notable people with the surname include:

Berkay Ömer Öğretir (born 1998), Turkish swimmer
Cem Öğretir (born 1973), Turkish TV presenter and reporter

Turkish-language surnames